Aurore Sarl is a French aircraft manufacturer based in Sauvagnon, founded by Michel Barry in the late 1990s. The company specializes in the design and manufacture of light aircraft in the form of kits for amateur construction.

The company is a French Société à responsabilité limitée (Sarl), a private limited company.

The company produces a series of wood and aircraft fabric aircraft under the trade name Air Souris Set. The line includes the Aurore MB 04 Souris Bulle two-seater, as well as the Aurore MB 02 Souricette and Aurore MB 02-2 Mini Bulle single-seater ultralights.

The Aurore MB 02 Souricette has also been flown as an all-electric aircraft, designated as the BL1E Electra. It was first flown on 23 December 2007 at Aspres sur Buech airfield, in Hautes Alpes, France.

Aircraft

References

External links

Aircraft manufacturers of France
Ultralight aircraft
Homebuilt aircraft
Companies based in Nouvelle-Aquitaine